Charles Higounet (13 January 1911 – 8 April 1988) was a French historian medievalist, specialising in bastides and the Middle Ages in the south-west of France.

Biography 

Charles Higounet was a French medievalist who taught in Bordeaux III University from 1946 to 1979, where a research center was named after him.
He used to be a specialist of bastides (a new and specific form of city in the Middle Ages) and the history of south-west France, and he was especially noticed after his history of Bordeaux, for which he won the historical prize, Grand prix Gobert, in 1973. He also led a team that worked on a historical atlas for French cities.
He also wrote a volume of the "Que sais-je?" (famous French collection of thousands of short reference essays, summarising the state of the knowledge on various subjects) on various forms of writing. The book has been re-edited more than ten times.

Published works 

 Les Allemands en Europe centrale et orientale au Moyen âge 1989 Aubier, 
 Atlas historique des villes de France, 1982
 Le Comté de Comminges, 1949
 Défrichements et villeneuves du Bassin parisien, 1990 Editions du Centre national de la recherche scientifique, 384 P
 L'Écriture, 1976
 La Gascogne au XIVe et XVe siècles, 1969
 Grand cartulaire de La Sauve-Majeure, 1996, Fédération historique du Sud-Ouest, 
 Histoire de Bordeaux..., dir, 1962 Editions Privat, 418 p
 Histoire de l'Aquitaine, dir, 1976
 Paysages et villages neufs du Moyen âge, 1975
 Recherches sur l'histoire de l'occupation du sol du Périgord, 1978, Editions du Centre national de la recherche scientifique, 
 Recueil des actes de l'Abbaye cistercienne de Bonnefont en Comminges, publ. by Charles Samaran,... and Charles Higounet, 1970, Collection de documents inédits sur l'histoire de France. Série in 8,
 La Seigneurie et le vignoble de Château-Latour, 1974
 Villes, sociétés et économies médiévales, recueil d'articles, 1992
 L'écriture, Que Sais-je, Presses universitaires de France, 2003.

Articles 
 "Les anciennes bastides du Sud-Ouest de la France", L’Information Historique, 1946, ps. 28–35.
 "Bastides et frontières", Le Moyen Age, 1948, t. LIV.
 "Les bastides du Sud-Ouest", Le Moyen Age, 1948.
 "La frange orientale des bastides", Annales du Midi, Tolosa, Privat, 1948–1949, t. LXI, ps. 359–367.
 "Villeneuves et bastides désertées", Villages désertés et histoire économique (XI-XVIIIe siècle), Les hommes et la terre-IX- Ecole pratique des Hautes Etudes, Paris, S.E.V.P.E.N., 1965, ps. 253–265.
 "Nouvelle approche sur les bastides du Sud-Ouest aquitain", Revue Urbanisme, Paris, 1967, n°101, ps. 32–35.
 "Les villeneuves du Piémont et les bastides de Gascogne (XIIe-XIVe siècles)", Compte-Rendus de l'Acad. des Inscr. et Belles Lettres, Paris, 1970, ps. 130–139.
 "Paysages et Villages neufs du Moyen Age", recueil d'articles, Bordeaux, 1975, 492 p.
 "Les bastides en question", Revue Urbanisme, Paris, n°173–174, Paris, 1979, p. 6–10.
 "La place dans les bastides médiévales", Plazas et sociabilité en Europe et Amérique latine, Publications de la Case de Velasquez, sér. Recherches en Sciences Sociales, Paris, fasc. VI, 1982, p. 119
 "Villes, sociétés et économies médiévales" / Recueil d'articles de Charles Higounet, Talence, Institut d'histoire, Université de Bordeaux III, Fédération historique du Sud-Ouest, 1992.
 and many others...

1911 births
1988 deaths
French medievalists
20th-century French historians
French male non-fiction writers
Historical geographers
20th-century French male writers